Podgorye is a rural locality (a village) in Vakhnevskoye Rural Settlement, Nikolsky District, Vologda Oblast, Russia. The population was 47 as of 2002.

Geography 
Podgorye is located 35 km northwest of Nikolsk (the district's administrative centre) by road. Zakharovo is the nearest rural locality.

References 

Rural localities in Nikolsky District, Vologda Oblast